Belinda Bencic was the defending champion, but chose to compete in the women's singles where she lost to Simona Halep in the third round.

Jeļena Ostapenko defeated Kristína Schmiedlová in the final, 2–6, 6–3, 6–0 to win the girls' singles tennis title at the 2014 Wimbledon Championships.

Seeds

  Ivana Jorović (second round)
  CiCi Bellis (first round)
  Tornado Alicia Black (quarterfinals)
  Aliona Bolsova Zadoinov (first round)
  Jil Teichmann (third round)
  Iryna Shymanovich (first round)
  Françoise Abanda (third round)
  Kristína Schmiedlová (final)
  Anhelina Kalinina (third round)
  Xu Shilin (quarterfinals)
  Ioana Loredana Roșca (third round)
  Markéta Vondroušová (semifinals)
  Priscilla Hon (first round)
  Sandra Samir (first round)
  Anna Bondár (first round)
  Naiktha Bains (first round)

Draw

Finals

Top half

Section 1

Section 2

Bottom half

Section 3

Section 4

References

External links

Girls' Singles
Wimbledon Championship by year – Girls' singles